Hallmark Drama is an American cable television channel owned by Hallmark Cards' Crown Media Holdings. It is the sister channel to Hallmark Channel and Hallmark Movies & Mysteries, and focuses on family-friendly dramatic storytelling.

History
In 2009, Crown Media Holdings and Hallmark chairman Donald J. Hall Jr. announced a new Hallmark network called "Hallmark Drama Channel". It was set to launch on March 2010, but the project was cancelled. In May 2017, the concept was picked up by Hallmark Channel (which at the time, is owned by Crown Media Holdings). The launch date was announced on June 1, 2017, and Hallmark Drama network was launched on October 1, 2017. The channel's first new programming, Christmas Cookie Matchup in early December.

Programming
Hallmark Drama's programming consists of family friendly movies and TV series from acquired content and Hallmark network library that are not being aired on either of its sister channels, Hallmark Channel or Hallmark Movies & Mysteries. TV series from Hallmark library include Matlock and Magnum, P.I.  TV series airing on Hallmark Drama include Matlock, Little House on the Prairie, The Waltons,  and Magnum, P.I. 

On August 26, 2019, it was announced that a new series, the channel's planned first original content, Christmas Cookie Matchup, originally titled Christmas Cookie Countdown and aired in December 2019. Project Christmas Joy special was announced at the same time. air on December 10, 2019. The channel's first original movies were announced on July 26, 2019 as JL Family Ranch sequel and Signed, Sealed, Delivered franchise installment slated for 2020.

As of April 2022, programming consisted of The Waltons, Matlock, Dr. Quinn, Medicine Woman, Little House on the Prairie, Magnum, P.I.'' and movies during the weekend.

See also
List of Hallmark Channel Original Movies

References

External links
 

Television networks in the United States
Studio City, Los Angeles
English-language television stations in the United States
Hallmark Channel
Television channels and stations established in 2017
2017 establishments in the United States